Energy engineering or Energy Systems Engineering is a broad field of engineering dealing with energy efficiency, energy services, facility management, plant engineering, environmental compliance, sustainable energy and renewable energy technologies. Energy engineering is one of the most recent engineering disciplines to emerge. Energy engineering combines knowledge from the fields of physics, math, and chemistry with economic and environmental engineering practices. Energy engineers apply their skills to increase efficiency and further develop renewable sources of energy.
The main job of energy engineers is to find the most efficient and sustainable ways to operate buildings and manufacturing processes. Energy engineers audit the use of energy in those processes and suggest ways to improve the systems. This means suggesting advanced lighting, better insulation, more efficient heating and cooling properties of buildings. Although an energy engineer is concerned about obtaining and using energy in the most environmentally friendly ways, their field is not limited to strictly renewable energy like hydro, solar, biomass, or geothermal. Energy engineers are also employed by the fields of oil and natural gas extraction.

Purpose
Energy minimization is the purpose of this growing discipline. Often applied to building design, heavy consideration is given to HVAC, lighting, refrigeration, to both reduce energy loads and increase efficiency of current systems. Energy engineering is increasingly seen as a major step forward in meeting carbon reduction targets. Since buildings and houses consume over 40% of the United States energy, the services an energy engineer performs are in demand.

History
Human beings have been transferring energy from one form to another since their use of fire. The efficiency of the transfer of energy is a new field. The oil crisis of 1973 and energy crisis of 1979 brought to light the need to get more work out of less energy. The United States government passed several laws in the seventies to promote increased energy efficiency, such as United States public law 94-413, the Federal Clean Car Incentive Program.

Power engineering
Considered a subdivision of energy engineering, power engineering applies math and physics to the movement and transfer of energy to work in a system.

Leadership in Energy and Environmental Design
Leadership in Energy and Environmental Design (LEED) is a program created by the United States Green Building Council (USGBC) in March 2000. LEED is a program that encourages green building and promotes sustainability in the construction of buildings and the efficiency of the utilities in the buildings.

In 2012 the United States Green Building Council asked the independent firm Booz Allen Hamilton to conduct a study on the effectiveness of LEED program. "This study confirmed that green buildings generate substantial energy savings. From 2000–2008, green construction and renovation generated $1.3 billion in energy savings. Of that $1.3 billion, LEED-certified buildings accounted for $281 million." The study also found the summation of all green construction supported 2.4 million jobs.

Energy efficiency
Energy efficiency is seen two ways. The first view is that more work is done from the same amount of energy used. The other perception is that the same amount of work is accomplished with less energy used in the system. Some ways to get more work out of less energy is to "Reduce, Reuse, and Recycle" the materials used in daily life. The advancement of technology has led to other uses of waste. Technology such as waste-to-energy facilities which convert solid wastes through the process of gasification or pyrolysis to liquid fuels to be burned. The Environmental Protection Agency stated that the United States produced 250 million tons of municipal waste in 2010. Of that 250 million tons roughly 54% gets thrown in land fills, 33% is recycled, and 13% goes to energy recovery plants. In European countries who pay more for fuel, such as Denmark where the price of gas neared  in 2010, have more fully developed waste-to energy facilities. In 2010 Denmark sent 7% of waste to landfills, 69% was recycled, and 24% was sent to waste-to-energy facilities. There are several other developed Western European countries that also have taken energy engineering into consideration. Germany's "Energiewende", a policy which set the goal by 2050 to meet 80% of electrical needs from renewable energy sources.

Statistics
The median yearly salary for an energy engineer is $64,587 U.S. dollars. 83% of energy engineers are male while the remaining 17% are female. 65% of energy engineers have less than five years of experience in their profession.

Education
A bachelor's degree is a primary requirement of becoming an energy engineer, while a student who wants to become an energy engineer does not directly need to get a degree in energy engineering, several universities across the world have established departments or centers offering energy engineering degrees, to better prepare future engineers for their career. One of those programs is the IEP PEM Certification which is offered at Virginia Tech University. The Certified Professional Energy Manager (PEM) was created in conjunction by the Institute of Energy Professionals (IEP) and Energy University. Since 2009, Energy University has provided energy efficiency education to more than 130,000 professionals worldwide. The program offers more than 150 courses.

Notable energy engineers
Martin Bercovici (1902–1971), Romanian electrical engineer 
Claudia Sheinbaum (born 1962), Mexican scientist and head of government of Mexico City

Notes

References

External links
Association of Energy Engineers 
World Energy Engineering Congress
Penn State Energy Engineering
Energy Managers Association

 
Engineering disciplines